The Feminist Party of Germany is a political party in Germany.

In the 2005 German federal election, the party won 0.1% of the popular vote and no seats. They repeated this result at the 2019 European Parliament election in Germany.

The feminist Party of Germany is a founding member of the Feminists United Network Europe (FUN Europe).

On October 30, 2010, the first European Conference of Feminist Parties took place in Valencia, Spain. An umbrella organization of feminist parties in Europe was founded. The Initiativa Feminista from Spain, the Partia Kobiet (women's party) from Poland and the Feministiskt initiativ from Sweden together with the feminist party DIE FRAUEN founded a coordination council as the umbrella organization of the feminist parties in Europe. FUN is the name of the network, which was expanded to include political groups from other countries.

References

External links
Official website

Political parties in Germany
Feminism in Germany
Feminist parties in Europe
Women's organisations based in Germany